Spider plant is a common name for several plants and may refer to:

Chlorophytum comosum, the commonly cultivated houseplant
Chlorophytum, a genus of plants in the Asparagus family
Saxifraga flagellaris, also known as whiplash saxifrage
Cleome, a genus of flowering plants.